A Madea Homecoming is a 2022 American comedy film produced, written, and directed by Tyler Perry and his second film to be released by Netflix. Besides Perry, the film stars Cassi Davis-Patton, David Mann, Tamela Mann, Gabrielle Dennis, and Brendan O'Carroll. It is the twelfth film in the Madea cinematic universe which tells the story of Madea partaking in her great-grandson's college graduation party as hidden secrets emerge and surprise visitors show up. It was released on February 25, 2022. It is adapted from Perry's stage play Madea's Farewell Play, the first Madea film to be adapted from a stage play since A Madea Christmas. The film is also a crossover between the Madea franchise and the Irish sitcom Mrs. Brown's Boys.

Plot
In Atlanta, Georgia, Mr. Brown puts too much gasoline on the barbecue and sets himself on fire.

Other family members are getting ready for Tim's graduation celebration. Cora arrives with groceries and talks about how places in their neighborhood got burnt down in the riots. Laura arrives with divorce lawyer friend Sylvia.

Tim and Davi arrive with Tim's aunt Ellie in her police uniform. Joe tells her to get rid of it, saying police are criminals. She refuses, but later takes it off.

Aunt Bam starts hitting on Davi and Tim. Joe says he suspects the two boys are gay.

Agnes Brown and her daughter Cathy arrive and after doing the "Wakanda Forever" salute, thinking her hosts were true Africans, Cora slams the door on them before letting them in. Madea starts threatening Agnes until Davi explains she is his great-aunt. Agnes asks "Why do you all look like you have your knickers in a bunch?" but everyone mishears "knickers" as "niggers". She lifts her skirt to explain that "knickers" are underwear.

They go to dinner at Red Lobster, where Cora gives Brown candy from Madea's purse for his blood sugar levels. Madea irritates Cora by reminiscing about her days as a stripper. Madea tries to show the restaurant is full of strippers by shouting a line from "Up", whereupon nearly all of the women reply. Joe arrives wearing Black Lives Matter memorabilia and resumes insulting Ellie over her police job. Back at the house Tim's father Richard has been waiting. Madea fires her gun without warning, making Joe defecate in his leather pants.

While washing dishes Laura tells Agnes she is confused that Davi, after graduation, will return to Ireland to take over his grandfather's farm.

Tim makes an announcement, coming out as gay. Everyone says they already knew. Sylvia reveals she has been secretly dating Richard. Madea orders Richard and Sylvia to leave at gunpoint.

Seeing Mr. Brown and Agnes acting strangely, Cora tells Madea she gave them candy from her purse. Madea reveals it was marijuana. Mr. Brown, as "The Brown Panther", jumps off the roof in his underwear with a bed sheet cape and knocks himself out.

Laura and Ellie are discussing Richard and Sylvia when Madea claims her roommate Rosa Parks stole her boyfriend in 1955, inadvertently setting off the Montgomery bus boycott and the Civil Rights movement as a whole.

The next morning, when Agnes apologizes Madea says she will give her the recipe for the chocolate marijuana. Tensions rise when Richard and Sylvia come back to the barbecue. Davi fights with Richard and Richard hits Laura by accident. Davi reveals he has been seeing Laura and proposes to her. She declines.

Laura tells Ellie of her confusion that Davi is returning to Ireland. Ellie questions the reason Laura declined Davi's proposal. Tim rejects Davi's apology. Madea tells Laura to feel okay about the drama and apologize and convinces Tim to forgive Davi. At the graduation, Tim rips up his prepared speech and speaks about his family, apologizing to Davi and Laura, and crediting all his family for their love and support. When he gives credit to his father Richard, Madea interrupts to insult Richard.

The family congratulates Tim and Davi, Tim having told Davi he approves of his relationship with Laura. Davi proposes again to Laura who says yes. Agnes gives him her blessing, revealing that his grandfather need not know as he's in prison for sleeping with a sheep in a hotel. Agnes and Cathy prepare to return to Ireland. Madea says she can't accept Agnes' invitation to visit because "there is too much sand", having confused Ireland with Iran the whole time.

As the credits roll, Madea parodies Beyonce and Mary J. Blige.

Cast
 Tyler Perry as:
 Mabel "Madea" Simmons, Perry also portrays Madea in the flashback sequence
 Joe Simmons, Madea's brother
 Cassi Davis-Patton as Aunt Bam, Madea's cousin
 David Mann as Leroy Brown, a man who was thought to be Cora's biological father until Madea's Big Happy Family
 Tamela Mann as Cora Simmons, Madea's daughter
 Gabrielle Dennis as Laura, Madea's granddaughter, Cora's daughter and Tim's mother
 Brandon Black as Timothy "Tim" Marshall, Madea's great-grandson, Cora's grandson and Laura's son who is struggling to come out
 Isha Blaaker as Davi O'Malley, Agnes's great-nephew, Cathy's second cousin and Tim's best friend
 Brendan O'Carroll as Agnes Brown, Davi's great-aunt. O'Carroll reprises his role from Mrs. Brown's Boys
 Jennifer Gibney as Cathy Brown, Agnes's daughter and Davi's first-cousin-once-removed. Gibney reprises her role from Mrs. Brown's Boys
 Geneva Maccarone as Sylvia, Laura's friend and Richard's fiancée
 Amani Atkinson as Richard, Laura's former husband, Tim's father and Sylvia's fiancée
 Candace Maxwell as Ellie, Madea's granddaughter, Cora's daughter and Laura's sister

Production
After originally planning to retire the Madea character after A Madea Family Funeral and Madea's Farewell Play, Tyler Perry later reverted these plans on a joint announcement with Netflix announcing Madea's return to film. Filming took place at Tyler Perry Studios in June 2021.

Release
The film was released on February 25, 2022 by Netflix.

Reception

 Metacritic gave the film a weighted average score of 42 out of 100 based on 6 critics, indicating "mixed or average reviews".

References

External links
 
 

2022 films
2022 comedy films
American films based on plays
American comedy films
Films shot in Atlanta
Films with screenplays by Tyler Perry
Films directed by Tyler Perry
English-language Netflix original films
2022 LGBT-related films
African-American LGBT-related films
Gay-related films
2020s English-language films
2020s American films